"Rolling in the Deep" is a song recorded by English singer-songwriter Adele for her second studio album, 21 (2011). It is the lead single and opening track on the album. The song was written by Adele and Paul Epworth. The singer herself describes it as a "dark blues-y gospel disco tune". In 2011 it was reportedly the biggest crossover hit in the United States since 1985; "Rolling in the Deep" gained radio airplay from many different radio formats. It was first released on 29 November 2010 as the lead single from 21 in digital download format. The lyrics describe the emotions of a scorned lover.

"Rolling in the Deep" received widespread critical acclaim with praise drawn towards the song's production, its lyrics, and Adele's vocal performance. It represented a commercial breakthrough for Adele, propelling her to global superstardom. The song topped the charts in twelve countries and reached the top 10 in over twenty territories. It was Adele's first number-one song in the United States, reaching the top spot on many Billboard charts, including the Billboard Hot 100 where it was number one for seven weeks. By February 2012, "Rolling in the Deep" had sold over 8.7 million copies in the United States, making it the best-selling digital song by a female artist in the US, the second-best-selling digital song in the US and Adele's best-selling single outside her native country, topping her previous best-selling "Chasing Pavements". Worldwide, it was the fifth-best-selling digital single of 2011 with sales of 8.2 million copies. , with sales of over 20.6 million copies worldwide, "Rolling in the Deep" is one of the best-selling digital singles of all-time. The song spent 65 weeks on the chart, making the song at that time the fourth-most weeks spent on the chart, tying the place with Jewel with her double single "Foolish Games"/"You Were Meant for Me".

Its music video received a leading seven nominations at the 2011 MTV Video Music Awards, including for Video of the Year, and won three other awards: Best Editing, Best Cinematography and Best Art Direction. "Rolling in the Deep" was also the Billboard Year End Hot 100 Number One Single of 2011. At the 54th Annual Grammy Awards, it won awards for Record of the Year, Song of the Year, and Best Short Form Music Video. Various critics and music publications ranked it as the best song of the year on their end-of-year lists with Rolling Stone ranking it at No. 8 spot on its list of "The 100 Greatest Songs of the 21st Century". In 2021, the song was ranked at number 82 on the list of [[Rolling Stone's 500 Greatest Songs of All Time|Rolling Stones 500 Greatest Songs of All Time]].

Background and composition

In an interview Adele expressed her initial reservations prior to meeting Paul Epworth due to their divergent musical styles, but characterised their collaboration as "a match made in heaven." She also credited Epworth for her increased vocal confidence, stating, "He brought a lot out of me. He brought my voice out as well—there's notes that I hit in that song ("Rolling in the Deep") that I never even knew I could hit." According to reviewer Bill Lamb, "Rolling in the Deep" features "martial beats, pounding piano keys and chanting backing singers". Adele's vocals have been described as having a "hint of Wanda Jackson's dirty-blues growl". According to Nadine Cheung from AOL Radio Blog the song is "sung from the perspective of a scorned lover, who is finally able to see the light, but despite regretful sentiments, reconciliation is not an option here." "Rolling in the Deep" is written in the key of C minor (B minor for live performances), in common time with a tempo of 105 beats per minute. The accompaniment uses open fifths, in a progression of C5(i5)–G5(v5)–B5(VII5)–G5(v5)–B5(VII5) and two Progressions of Progression #1: A(VI)-B(VII)-Gm(v)-A(VI)-B(VII)-A(VI)-B(VII)-Gm(v)-G(V), Progression #2: Cm(i)-B(VII)-AMaj7(VI M7)-B(VII). Adele's voice spans from B3 to D5. Musically, Simon Reynolds of The New York Times described the song as "1960s rhythm-and-blues tightened up with modern production" and vocals rooted in soul.

The song was reportedly inspired by a Nashville-schooled US tour bus driver, and composed by Epworth and Adele in a single afternoon following Adele's breakup with her boyfriend. It was "her reaction to, 'being told that my life was going to be boring and lonely and rubbish, and that I was a weak person if I didn't stay in the relationship. I was very insulted, and wrote that as a sort of "fuck you".'"

Reception
 Critical response 
Lamb gave it a score of 5 out of 5, saying: "'Rolling in the Deep' [...] wastes no time in presenting the stunning bluesy authority of her voice....Here is a voice that can raise chills up the spine, and, when she is in a mood like this, the sense of foreboding will rivet your attention." Jason Lipshutz of Billboard magazine complimented the song's "sweeping chorus" and felt that the song "places a similar emphasis on its refrain but its multilayered instrumentation gives the English singer's wail a previously unheard depth". Lipshutz said, "Adele's noticeable leap in vocal confidence highlights the track. She gracefully lingers on the last line of the verses and attacks the sorrowful chorus' first words, 'We could have had it all,' head on." Rolling Stone magazine's Barry Walters stated, "'Rolling in the Deep' finds the 22-year-old in bluesy gospel mode, sounding powerful but not particularly pop. Starting with a stroked acoustic guitar, this breakup-mourning track builds to a stomping, hand-clapping climax that affirms the British knack for rejiggering the sound of American roots music."

The writers of Rolling Stone placed "Rolling in the Deep" at number one on their list of "50 Best Singles of 2011". Claire Suddath of Time magazine named "Rolling in the Deep" one of the Top 10 Songs of 2011. MTV chose the song as their "Song of the Year". The Village Voices Pazz & Jop annual critics' poll ranked "Rolling in the Deep" as the top single of 2011. In 2019, Rolling Stone, Consequence of Sound, and Pitchfork ranked the song as the 3rd, 8th, and 171st best song of the 2010s, respectively. Time named it as one of the 10 best songs of the 2010s, and Billboard chose the song as one of the 100 "Songs That Defined the Decade". In 2021, Parade ranked the song number one on their list of the 25 greatest Adele songs, and in 2022, American Songwriter ranked the song number eight on their list of the 10 greatest Adele songs.

Chart performance 
In the UK, "Rolling in the Deep" debuted at number 2 (her second number 2 debut, after "Chasing Pavements"), behind Bruno Mars's "Grenade". The song spent the first ten weeks of its chart run in the top ten.

Upon its American release, "Rolling in the Deep" became Adele's second single to chart in the country. The song debuted on the Billboard Hot 100 at number 68 on 25 December 2010. Later on, it became her first ever single to top a Billboard chart when it reached number one on the Hot Adult Top 40 Tracks chart in May 2011, and became her first number one hit in the country when it topped the Billboard Hot 100 in May 2011. As a result, Adele became the first British singer to have topped both the Billboard Hot 100 and Billboard 200 charts in the same week since Leona Lewis did the same back in 2008. In its 24th charting week, "Rolling in the Deep" stayed at number one, making it the latest single at the top since Lady Gaga's "Just Dance" spent its third and final week at number one in its 24th charting week as well. It stayed on top of the chart for seven straight weeks, the second longest run in 2011 behind Rihanna's "We Found Love", which spent eight weeks on top in 2011, and two weeks in 2012.

It has been certified 8× platinum, and in September 2011 became the first song to sell 5 million in digital sales, achieving the feat in 35 weeks, faster than any other song in digital history. , "Rolling in the Deep" sold 8.4 million digital copies in the United States, becoming the second-best-selling digital song overall and the best-selling digital song by a female artist. It was the second song to have crossed 8 million digital copies sold in the country. In France, despite not having been certified, the single has sold 348,900 copies and became one of the best-selling singles in France.

, "Rolling in the Deep" was the third-best-selling digital single across Europe with 1.26 million copies sold. As of the 5 November 2011 issue of Billboard, it had been number one on the Adult Contemporary chart for 19 consecutive weeks. "Rolling in the Deep" became Adele's label XL Recordings' best-selling single, overtaking M.I.A.'s "Paper Planes" released in 2008 which until 2011 held the record. The song became also the longest-charting release in Finland, peaking at number one and charting for 50 weeks.

In 2013, as a celebration of the chart's 55th anniversary, Billboard counted down the 100 biggest Hot 100 hits ever, and the song was ranked at number 31. In 2018, it was placed at number 35.

In Australia, "Rolling in the Deep" entered the singles chart at number 40 in the week of 14 November 2010, and reached a peak position of number three where it remained for four weeks. In New Zealand, the song debuted at its peak position at number three, and was her highest-charting single in both countries until the release of her single "Someone Like You". The song achieved number one positions in Belgium (both Flanders & Wallonia), Finland, Germany, Portugal, Switzerland, and the Netherlands, remaining atop the Dutch Top 40 singles chart for seven weeks. It reached the top ten in Austria, Bulgaria, Denmark, France, Ireland, and Norway. It reached the top 20 in Sweden.

 Music video 
The music video for "Rolling in the Deep," directed by Sam Brown, premiered on Channel 4 on 3 December 2010.
The video begins in an abandoned house, where Adele is sitting in a chair singing. During the video, the scenes show hundreds of glasses filled with water that vibrate to the beat of a drum. Jennifer White, who also choreographed the sequence, dances in a room kicking up white flour. The drummer plays his drums under the stairs, and china is thrown breaking on a piece of suspended plywood at the bottom of a staircase. There is a white model of a city which is set on fire by five bursting light bulbs at the end of the song. The music video received critical acclaim, with critics praising its dark tone and simplicity.

On 20 July 2011, the music video was nominated for seven MTV Video Music Awards, including Video of the Year, Best Female Video, Best Pop Video and Best Direction, and won three for Best Editing, Best Cinematography and Best Art Direction. The video won the Grammy Award for Best Short Form Music Video on 12 February 2012. , the music video has received over 2 billion views, and 10 million likes on YouTube.

Accolades
"Rolling in the Deep" won Best Track at the 2011 Q Awards. At the 54th Annual Grammy Awards, "Rolling in the Deep" won in the categories of Record of the Year, Song of the Year, and Best Short Form Music Video, making it just the second song in Grammy history to win all three awards after We Are the World in 1986.
 

 Promotion 
Adele performed the song several times. On 25 November 2010, the singer appeared on Dutch presenter Paul de Leeuw's Madiwodovrij Show to perform the song for the first time. She also performed it on The Ellen DeGeneres Show in the United States on 3 December 2010. The song was also performed in front of the Royal Family at the Royal Variety Performance, on 9 December 2010; the performance was broadcast 16 December 2010. On Alan Carr: Chatty Man in the United Kingdom on 17 January 2011. On 21 January 2011, Adele performed "Rolling in the Deep" in the finale of The Voice of Holland where she also performed "Make You Feel My Love" with finalist Kim de Boer. On 26 January 2011, she performed the song in the French television show Le Grand Journal. The song has also been featured in a television spot for the 2011 film I Am Number Four, in which it is also featured. As part of a promotional tour in North America for the album, Adele performed the song on Late Show with David Letterman on 21 February 2011, on Jimmy Kimmel Live! on 24 February 2011, on 1 March 2011 on MTV Live, and Dancing with the Stars on 10 May 2011. On 12 February 2012, she made another rendition of the song at the 54th Grammy Awards.

 Media usage 
"Rolling in the Deep" first gained attention when it was used in a trailer for the film I Am Number Four and in the film itself. It has since been featured in several television series such as in 90210 third season, in Doctor Who sixth series premiere, in One Tree Hill eighth season, in Gossip Girl fourth-season finale, The Secret Life of the American Teenager fourth season. and in the Scandal's Pilot promo. "Rolling in the Deep" was used as the theme song for E4's reality series Made in Chelsea and appeared in So You Think You Can Dance eighth season during contestant Mitchell Kelly's solo performance. In Renny Harlin's 2016 film Skiptrace, a drunk Jackie Chan sang "Rolling in the Deep" at the tune of local instruments in a Mongolian village only to be taken by surprise by how the song was already popular among the non-English speaking locals, when they started to sing with him.

The instrumental of the song was used in Apple Inc's marketing video for the iPhone 4S. It was also featured in CBC's intro to Game 1 of the hockey 2011 Stanley Cup Finals between the Vancouver Canucks and the Boston Bruins. while the song's instrumentals were played heavily in promos during the 2011 NBA Draft. The song was played in the background during the parade of athletes at the 2012 Summer Olympics.

In early 2016, US businessman and media personality Donald Trump began using "Rolling in the Deep" as warm-up music at rallies during his campaign to become that year's Republican Party candidate for President of the United States, prompting Adele to issue a statement distancing herself from Trump. A spokesperson for the singer confirmed that "Adele has not given permission for her music to be used for any political campaigning." The song is one of two by Adele that Trump used as part of his campaign, the other being "Skyfall". Trump continued to use the songs despite Adele's objections. Commentators, including David Lister of The Independent, have noted that United States Copyright law does not prevent politicians from using pieces of music at their rallies, providing the venue has a public performance licence.

 Track listing 
 Digital download"Rolling in the Deep" – 3:48

 Digital EP "Rolling in the Deep" – 3:48
 "Rolling in the Deep (Jamie xx Shuffle)" – 4:17
 "Rolling in the Deep (Acapella)" – 3:56

 CD single "Rolling in the Deep" – 3:48
 "If It Hadn't Been for Love"  – 3:09

 The RemixesRolling in the Deep (Downtown London Remix) – 3:52
Rolling in the Deep (Paul Oakenfold Remix) – 4:20
 "Rolling in the Deep (Avicii Remix)" – 4:25

 Credits and personnel 
 Lead vocals, backing vocals, stiletto heel tapping – Adele
 Songwriting – Adele Adkins, Paul Epworth
 Production, Bass guitar, acoustic guitar, electric guitar, percussion and backing vocals – Paul Epworth 
 Mixing – Tom Elmhirst
 Mixing assistant – Dan Parry
 Piano – Neil Cowley
 Drums – Leo Taylor
 Recording Engineer – Mark Rankin
 Mastering – Tom Coyne

Credits adapted from 21 liner notes:

 Charts 

 Weekly charts 

Year-end charts

Decade-end charts

All-time charts

 Certifications and sales 

 Release history 

 Cover versions 
 Linkin Park version 

"Rolling in the Deep" was covered by American rock band Linkin Park and was included on their live EP, iTunes Festival. It has entered the UK Rock Singles Charts at number 1, and UK Singles chart at number 42 although it has not been released as a single. The song was covered twice by the band, one was a LPU meeting and one was in The Roundhouse during the 2011 iTunes Festival. The song was well received by the UK.  "Rolling in the Deep" was sent to alternative radio stations as a promotional single on 8 July 2011. Performed as an acoustic version of the song as part of their set, with Chester Bennington as the lead vocalist and Mike Shinoda on the piano. This recording was released to the iTunes Store as a single.

 Charts 

Aretha Franklin version

In 2014, Aretha Franklin covered the song on her Aretha Franklin Sings the Great Diva Classics album. It was released 29 September 2014 as the collection's lead single. This version peaked at number one on the US dance chart, giving Aretha Franklin her sixth number one on the chart. It also debuted at number 47 on the Billboard Hot R&B/Hip-Hop Songs chart. Franklin thus becomes the first female, and fourth artist overall (following Lil Wayne, Jay-Z and James Brown), to place 100 songs on the charts (with her first entry on the chart being "Today I Sing the Blues" in 1960). This version of "Rolling in the Deep" entitled "Rolling in the Deep (The Aretha Version)"''' was Franklin's final single to be released before her retirement in 2017, and her death the following year.

 Charts 

 Other covers 
The Piano Guys adapted the melody for piano and cello in a mashup with the orchestral suite "Jupiter" by Gustav Holst. Japanese rock duo Glim Spanky covered the song for their 2014 EP Shōsō.

The song became popular and has been covered by various artists including David Cook, Ariana Grande, Haley Reinhart, Nicole Scherzinger, The Overtones and rapper Lil Wayne. In January 2011, Jamie xx remixed the song, on top of which Childish Gambino later added a rap verse. In February 2011, Mike Posner released a cover of the song. Idolator described his version as "a very cool electronic piece that still somehow manages to retain the heartbroken feel of Adele's original tune." The same month, Scottish band Kassidy also covered the song. John Legend uploaded an R&B a cappella version of the song in April 2011 on SoundCloud. "Rolling in the Deep" was then covered by Lea Michele and Jonathan Groff of Glee for the second season episode "Prom Queen". The single charted at number 29 on the Billboard Hot 100 and at 49 on the UK Singles Chart and was later released on the album Glee: The Music, Volume 6. Black Stone Cherry have covered the song live on several occasions, and it was covered by Celine Dion on her Las Vegas Show.

On 14 July 2011, Patti Smith covered "Rolling in the Deep" during a performance at the Castle Clinton. In July 2011, PS22 Chorus sang the song at the Newport Folk Festival. Quentin Elias released a cover of the song as a single on 6 September 2011. It also appears on his EP I Can Do Bad All By Myself released simultaneously. Pop-Punk band, Go Radio covered the song for the compilation CD Punk Goes Pop 4, released by Fearless Records. The Collective performed the song on the third season of The Sing-Off. A version as also done by The Piano Guys that was uploaded to YouTube on 7 September 2011. October 2011, Misha B performed a 'show-stopping' cover of the track on the eighth season of The X Factor  regarded by the Daily Telegraph as one of the highlights of the series. The Telegraph noted that Misha B delivered "impressive soulful vocals and a quirky rapping style" injecting it with a "fresh UK urban twist". Mexican sibling trio Vazquez Sounds released a cover version which quickly became popular on YouTube. It was later released as a single in Mexico and was certified platinum by AMPROFON. Popular child singer and Britain's Got Talent 2007 finalist Connie Talbot has also covered the song on her YouTube  and received over 20 million hits. Because Connie's version was recorded with a camera, it was later  in order for the music to be heard better. On 12 June 2012, Celine Dion covered the song at her Vegas show at The Colosseum at Caesars Palace, before she performed the song, she told the crowd, "I love Adele so much. She's amazing." A cover by metalcore band Amyst was played to Adele by Jonathan Ross on his TV show in September 2011, to a poor reception from Adele, who along with Ross dismissed it as "screamo". The Spanish Band Auryn covered the song in their album Endless Road, 7058 released on 18 October 2011.

Gille, a mysterious Japanese singer who became an online sensation for her English covers of Japanese pop songs, uploaded a cover of "Rolling in the Deep" to her YouTube channel on 31 January 2012. This version was later released in Japan as part of her debut album on 18 July 2012.

In 2013, Straight No Chaser covered the song on their Under the Influence album.

On 2 April 2016, Kevin Simm performed the song in the semi-final stage of The Voice UK''.

On 9 February 2018, Filipino artist KZ Tandingan performed her own rendition of 'Rolling in the Deep' on the 5th episode of China's biggest singing competition, Singer (TV Series), on its 6th season run, Singer (season 6). As her debut stage as a challenger, KZ Tandingan swept the competition and wowed the international stage and was voted as the top singer for that episode.
 

On 9 March 2021, La Poem performed the song in the 7th episode of Phantom Singer All Stars.

See also 

 List of best-selling singles
 List of best-selling singles in South Korea
 List of best-selling singles in the United States
 List of best-selling singles in Australia
 List of Dutch Top 40 number-one singles of 2011
 List of Hot 100 number-one singles of 2011 (Canada)
 List of Hot 100 number-one singles of 2011 (U.S.)
 List of Mainstream Top 40 number-one hits of 2011 (U.S.)
 List of number-one adult contemporary singles of 2011 (U.S.)
 List of number-one Adult Top 40 singles of 2011
 List of number-one dance singles of 2015 (U.S.)
 List of number-one hits of 2011 (Germany)
 List of number-one hits of 2011 (Italy)
 List of number-one hits of 2011 (Switzerland)
 List of number-one pop hits of 2011 (Brazil)
 List of number-one singles of 2012 (Finland)
 List of Ultratop 40 number-one singles of 2011
 List of Ultratop 50 number-one singles of 2011

References

External links 
 Article on the making of Rolling in the Deep by Paul Tingen in Sound on Sound magazine.

2010 singles
2010 songs
2014 singles
Adele songs
Aretha Franklin songs
Linkin Park songs
Billboard Hot 100 number-one singles
Canadian Hot 100 number-one singles
Columbia Records singles
Dutch Top 40 number-one singles
Grammy Award for Record of the Year
Grammy Award for Song of the Year
Grammy Award for Best Short Form Music Video
Number-one singles in Finland
Number-one singles in Germany
Number-one singles in Iceland
Number-one singles in Italy
Number-one singles in Switzerland
RCA Records singles
Song recordings produced by Paul Epworth
Song recordings produced by Rick Rubin
Songs written by Adele
Songs written by Paul Epworth
Ultratop 50 Singles (Flanders) number-one singles
Ultratop 50 Singles (Wallonia) number-one singles
Warner Records singles
XL Recordings singles